Christopher Kimball's Milk Street is a multimedia, instructional food preparation organization created by Christopher Kimball. The organization comprises a weekly half-hour television program seen on public television stations, a magazine called Christopher Kimball's Milk Street, a cooking school, a weekly one-hour radio program heard on public radio stations called Milk Street Radio, a website for video podcasts, as well as Milk Street Live! which broadcasts live cooking events.

Name and location
The organization is named after Milk Street in Boston, Massachusetts. It is headquartered in the Flour and Grain Exchange Building on Milk Street, which is in the Custom House District near Boston Harborwalk.

History

America's Test Kitchen Lawsuit
On October 31, 2016, Boston Commons Press sued Kimball. The then-Brookline based company (now based in Boston), which owns America's Test Kitchen (ATK) and Cook's Country, filed a lawsuit in Suffolk Superior Court against Kimball that alleged he "literally and conceptually ripped off America’s Test Kitchen". 

The lawsuit claimed that Kimball was in breach of trust when he built his new business while still employed by ATK and that he used their company's recipes and databases to enable Milk Street to be in direct competition with ATK. Jack Bishop, the chief creative officer at ATK, stated that the Milk Street magazine was very similar to Boston Commons Press-owned Cook's Illustrated. Kimball founded that magazine and was editor until November 2015 when he left over a contract dispute. The lawsuit was settled in 2019.

Milk Street Cafe Lawsuit
Kimball's Milk Street Organization was also sued by the Milk Street Cafe, owned by Marc Epstein, for trademark infringement. Epstein's Milk Street Cafe, established 35 years earlier, is located nearby at 50 Milk Street. The lawsuit was decided in Kimball's favor.

Television

Season 1

Season 2

Season 3

Season 4

Season 5

Season 6

Milk Street Radio
Milk Street also produces a weekly hour-long radio program titled Milk Street Radio, distributed by the Public Radio Exchange to a number of public radio stations and networks for weekend airing.  It also features TV chef and cookbook author Sara Moulton.  It premiered on October 20, 2016. Milk Street Radio is also distributed as a podcast.

Magazine
Each issue of the magazine is 30 to 40 pages and is published 6 times each year.

References

External links
 

2016 establishments in the United States
Online magazines published in the United States
American cooking websites
American public radio programs